Frederick Christian I (6 April 1721 – 13 November 1794) was Duke of Schleswig-Holstein-Sonderburg-Augustenburg from 1754 to 1794. 

He was the eldest son of Christian August, Duke of Schleswig-Holstein-Sonderburg-Augustenburg (1696–1754) and his wife Duchess Louise Frederikke née Countess af Danneskiold-Samsøe (1699–1744). In 1754, his father died and Frederick Christian inherited Augustenborg Castle and Gråsten. However, these estates were deeply in debt. He waived his claims on the duchies of Schleswig and Holstein and in return the King of Denmark (who was also Duke of Schleswig and Holstein) granted him a favourable settlement. This allowed him to purchase Als and Sundeved, making him the largest landowner in Schleswig. He was also able to expand Augustenborg Castle, the family residence.

Frederick Christian served as a general in the Danish army.  He was a Knight of the Order of the Elephant.

Marriage and issue 
On 26 May 1762, Frederick Christian married Princess Charlotte Amalie Wilhelmine (1744–1770), a daughter of Frederick Charles, Duke of Schleswig-Holstein-Sonderburg-Plön. The couple had seven children:

 Louise Christine Caroline (16 February 1763 – 27 January 1764);
 Louise Christine Caroline (17 February 1764 – 2 August 1815);
 Frederick Christian II (28 September 1765 – 14 June 1814), married Princess Louise Auguste of Denmark;
 Frederick Charles Emil (8 March 1767 – 14 June 1841), Danish General, married Sofie Eleonore Fredericka of Scheel (1776–1836; daughter of Baron Jürgen Eric of Scheel);
 Christian August (9 July 1768 – 28 May 1810), Danish general and, later, Crown Prince of Sweden as Karl August (died before he could ascend the throne);
 Sophie Amelie (10 August 1769 – 6 October 1769);
 Charles William (4 October 1770 – 22 February 1771).

Ancestors

References 

  Dansk biografisk Lexikon / V. Bind. Faaborg – Gersdorff / S.345f Digitalisat

External links 

 https://web.archive.org/web/20100405222104/http://www.geschichte-s-h.de/vonabisz/augustenburger.htm
 
Den Store Danske

Dukes of Schleswig-Holstein-Sonderburg-Augustenburg
Danish military personnel
House of Augustenburg
1721 births
1794 deaths
18th-century German people